Chubby Carrier And The Bayou Swamp Band is a Zydeco band from Louisiana founded by Chubby Carrier in 1989.

Awards
Chubby Carrier And The Bayou Swamp Band have a Grammy award for Best Zydeco or Cajun Music Album for their album Zydeco Junkie.  Also, they won Best Zydeco Album Award from Offbeat Magazine for the same album.

Discography
Blackpot (Swampadelic Records, 2018)
Back to My Roots (Swampadelic Records, 2013)
Rockin With Roy (Swampadelic Records, 2012)
Zydeco Junkie (Swampadelic Records, 2010)
Live at Knuckleheads, Kansas City (Swampadelic Records, 2007)
Bayou Road (Swampadelic Records, 2006)
Ain't No Party Like a Chubby Party (Swampadelic Records, 2005)
Take Me to the Zydeco (Swampadelic Records, 2001)
It's Party Time (Right Click Records, 1999)
Too Hot to Handle (Gulf Coast Entertainment Co. LLC, 1998)
Who Stole the Hot Sauce? (Blind Pig Records, 1996)
Dance All Night (Blind Pig Records, 1993)
Boogie Woogie Zydeco (Flying Fish Records, 1991)
Go Zydeco Go (Jewel Records, 1989)

References

Musical groups from Louisiana
Zydeco musicians
Musical quintets
Musical groups established in 1989
1989 establishments in Louisiana